The National Prize for Journalism, part of the National Prize of Chile, has been awarded since 1954. It was created by Law 11479 in 1953. It was granted annually until 1972, when Law 17595 changed it to a biennial prize.

From 1954 to 1963, it was granted in the categories writing, feature, and photography. In 1964 the drawing category was added. Between 1975 and 1993, mention was made of the winner's category.

Other important prizes in the same category, granted by individuals, are the Lenka Franulic Award (1963), the Embotelladora Andina Award (1979), and the Chilean Security Association Carmen Puelma Award (1994).

List of winners

1954–1972

Since 1975

References

External links
 Premio Nacional de Periodismo at Memoria Chilena

1954 establishments in Chile
Awards established in 1954
Chilean awards
Journalism awards
1953 in Chilean law